This is a list of electoral results for the Electoral district of Napier in South Australian state elections.

Members for Napier

Election results

Elections in the 2010s

Elections in the 2000s

Elections in the 1990s

Elections in the 1980s

Elections in the 1970s

References

SA elections archive: Antony Green ABC
2002 SA election: Antony Green ABC

South Australian state electoral results by district